Poor Valbuena (Spanish:El pobre Valbuena) is a 1923 Spanish silent film directed by José Buchs. It is based on a popular zarzuela of the same title.

Cast
 Alfonso Aguilar 
 María Anaya 
 Carmen Andrés
 María Comendador 
 Antonio Gil Varela 'Varillas' 
 Ana de Leyva 
 Celso Lucio 
 José Montenegro 
 Manuel San Germán

References

Bibliography
 Mira, Alberto. The A to Z of Spanish Cinema. Rowman & Littlefield, 2010.

External links

1923 films
Films based on works by Carlos Arniches
Films directed by José Buchs
Spanish silent films
Spanish black-and-white films